Daniel Moody Edwards (August 17, 1926 – August 7, 2001) was an American gridiron football player and coach.  He played professional as an end in the All-America Football Conference (AAFC), the Canadian Football League (CFL), and the National Football League (NFL).

Biography
Edwards played college football at Georgia. Drafted by the Pittsburgh Steelers in the 1st round (9th overall) of the 1948 NFL Draft, Edwards played for the AAFC's Brooklyn Dodgers (1948) and Chicago Hornets (1949) and the NFL's New York Yanks (1950–1951), Dallas Texans (1952) and Baltimore Colts (1953–1954). In 1950, he was selected for the Pro Bowl and First-team All-Pro. He holds the record for the shortest kick off return for a touchdown, 17 yards, set on October 17, 1949. 

Following his playing career, Edwards spent four seasons as a coach with the BC Lions and Edmonton Eskimos before leaving football to become an oil executive.

References

1926 births
2001 deaths
American football ends
Baltimore Colts players
BC Lions coaches
BC Lions players
Brooklyn Dodgers (AAFC) players
Chicago Hornets players
Dallas Texans (NFL) players
Edmonton Elks coaches
Georgia Bulldogs football players
New York Yanks players
Western Conference Pro Bowl players
People from Colorado County, Texas
Players of American football from Texas